Sven Helge "Dempsey" Johansson (December 27, 1905 – November 3, 1937) was a Swedish ice hockey player who competed in the 1924 Winter Olympics.

In 1924 he was a member of the Swedish ice hockey team which finished fourth in the Olympic ice hockey tournament.

References

External links 
 

1905 births
1937 deaths
Ice hockey players at the 1924 Winter Olympics
Olympic ice hockey players of Sweden
Sportspeople from Gotland County
Djurgårdens IF Hockey players